Sun Haiying (born 7 October 1956) is a Chinese actor.

Sun is noted for his roles as Shi Guangrong and Hong Qigong in the television series The Years of Intense Emotion (2001) and The Legend of the Condor Heroes (2002) respectively. He has now gained even greater popularity from his breakthrough role as Fan Zeng in King's War (2012).

Sun has won the 15th Shanghai International Film Festival - Best Supporting Actor in 2012 and the Flying Apsaras Award for Outstanding actor in 2002.

Life
Sun was born in a wealthy and highly educated family in Shenyang, Liaoning on October 7, 1956, the son of Hai Na, an actress, and Sun Haichang, the President of Liaoning People's Art Theatre.

At the age of 7, he joined the People's Liberation Army in Tibet, he was transferred to Fujian Military Region in 1979. Sun joined Shenyang Theatre in 1989 and became an actor.

On February 26, 2016, Sun's Sina Weibo was banned.

Sun was twice married. Originally wed to a female pharmacist in 1979, there had a son, he died early.

After a turbulent divorce, he remarried in 2002. Lǚ Lìpíng, his second wife, who is also a Chinese notable actress. Both Sun and Lǚ are Protestants.

Political positions

Role of the Chinese Communist Party
Sun questioned the statement "Without the Communist Party, There Would Be No New China", a slogan from a popular Chinese Communist Party (CCP) propaganda song, on his Sina Weibo. He publicly stated that "No matter who appeared, China will exist still."

Cultural Revolution
In August 2015, Sun said in a post on his Sina Weibo that "The Cultural Revolution is a crime against humanity, and we will never forgive it".

Freedom of religion
Sun supported the freedom of religion on his Sina Weibo and opposed the CCP's control of religions.

Filmography

Television

Film

Awards
 2002 Flying Apsaras Award for Outstanding actor
 2012 The Sino-Japanese War at Sea - China Movie Channel Media Awards - Best Supporting Actor

References

External links
  (Banned)
 

 

1956 births
Male actors from Shenyang
Male actors from Liaoning
Living people
Chinese male film actors
Chinese male television actors